Thiruvalluvar College of Engineering and Technology or popularly known as TCET,  located in Vandavasi, Tamil Nadu, India is a private educational institution in India.

About

Varadhammal manickam education and charitable trust [VMECT] was founded in 1996 as a non-profitable organization at 178,vagataranam pillai street, Triplicane, Chennai 600 005. The administrative office is located at R 6/4, vaigai street, bezant nagar, Chennai -600 090. The trustees are eminent personalities in various walks of life such as education, research, industry, business, administration etc.

Thiruvalluvar College of Engineering and Technology was founded in the year 1998 by Prof. Dr. S. Arunachalam M.E (Civil), PhD a Former Professor in Anna University and Former Syndicate Member - Anna University, Chennai.

The Institution is approved by A.I.C.T.E - All India Council for Technical Education, New Delhi and Affiliated to Anna University Chennai.

External links
Thiruvalluvar College of Engineering and Technology

Chennai
Colleges affiliated to Anna University
Education in Tiruvannamalai district
Educational institutions established in 1998
1998 establishments in Tamil Nadu